Knútr Sveinsson may refer to:

Cnut the Great (c. 995 – 1035)
Canute IV of Denmark (c. 1042 – 1086)